Saudi Khawlani Coffee Beans (Arabic: البن الخولاني السعودي) are a type of coffee bean cultivated in the region of the Khawlan mountains (Sarat Khawlan). These mountains spread from the southwestern part of Saudi Arabia to the northwestern part of Yemen. The province of Jazan in Saudi Arabia, where these mountains are situated, is the main region for the cultivation of this type of coffee due to the presence of all the geographical and climatic conditions required for its cultivation. The mountainous soil is rich in the necessary nutrients to give the coffee its distinctive flavour. The Saudi Khawlani coffee is characterised by an oily layer as well as its well-known and distinctive odour.

History of Saudi Khawlani Coffee Beans Cultivation in the Kingdom 
The national production of the Saudi Khawlani coffee bean comes from the mountainous regions of Jazan, Al Baha, and Aseer. In the south of the Kingdom, specialists have determined the age of Saudi Khawlani coffee bean cultivation to be more than eight centuries old, with Jazan Port being one of the most expensive Arab coffee outlets.

Harvesting 
The harvest phase of the Saudi Khawlani coffee tree crop begins during the annual harvest season, which runs from October to January. It takes approximately 3 years for the newly planted coffee trees to bear fruit. The ripening fruits are harvested and placed in a sheepskin bag or a special plastic jar, then dried in designated areas, preferably in the shade with less sunlight, and stirred for 3 weeks to retain their flavour.

Agricultural Production and Export in KSA 
The coffee sector accounted for about 0.86 percent of Saudi Arabia’s gross domestic product in 2020 and is expected to rise to 6.18 percent over the next five years. The Kingdom produces about 300 tons of high-quality Saudi Khawlani coffee beans a year, which are consumed locally and exported to the Gulf Cooperation Council countries.

Al-Dayer governorate, located in the eastern part of the Jazan region, occupies first place in the Kingdom of Saudi Arabia for the number of farms and Saudi Khawlani coffee trees, with a number of 994 farms that embrace more than 218,000 coffee trees, to produce more than 600,000 kilos of Saudi Khawlani coffee per year.

In the latest statistics on coffee production and the number of farms and trees in the Kingdom of Saudi Arabia for the year 2019, the GDP of Coffea Arabica reached 646 tons, and the number of coffee farms reached 847 farms containing 100,000 coffee trees, including 82,390 fruit trees.

Sixty-five percent of farmers in the mountains of Jazan are from the Al-Dayer governorate, according to the Jazan Mountain Development and Reconstruction Authority. The second largest number hail from Fayfa at 12 percent, followed by the governorates of Al- Reeth, Al-Edabi, Al-Aridhah and Harub. The number of coffee trees reached 160 thousand, of which 82,000 bear fruit, with a production volume of 330 tons for 2020.

There are more than 171,380 coffee trees in the Jazan region, of which 122,455 are in the Al-Dayer governorate. These produce up to 685,536 tons of coffee beans. However, the Al-Dayer area produces more than 489,820 tons of coffee beans, making it the capital of the Khawlani coffee beans in the Kingdom. There are over 1,596 coffee tree farmers in the Jazan region, and more than 919 of these are located in the Al-Dayer governorate.

Inscription on UNESCO 
On November 30, 2022, the Kingdom of Saudi Arabia succeeded in inscribing "Knowledge and practices related to cultivating Khawlani coffee beans" element on the Representative List of the Intangible Cultural Heritage of the United Nations Educational, Scientific and Cultural Organization (UNESCO).

References 

Intangible Cultural Heritage of Humanity
Saudi Arabian culture